German Vyacheslavovich Nesterov (born 31 August 1991) is a Belarusian ice hockey player for Rubin Tyumen in the Supreme Hockey League (VHL) and the Belarusian national team.

He represented Belarus at the 2021 IIHF World Championship.

References

External links
 

1991 births
Living people
Ariada Volzhsk players
Belarusian expatriate ice hockey people
Belarusian expatriate sportspeople in Kazakhstan
Belarusian expatriate sportspeople in Russia
Belarusian ice hockey forwards
Expatriate ice hockey players in Russia
HK Gomel players
Kristall Saratov players
People from Nizhnekamsk
Saryarka Karagandy players
HC Vityaz players